Eden Hill is a northern suburb of Perth, Western Australia, located within the Town of Bassendean. The origin of its name is unknown, either coming from a farm in the area or  an estate name used by Henry Brockman when he subdivided the area in 1892. It was approved as a suburb in 1954. The Swan Valley Nyungah Community was in the area.

As of the 2016 Census, the total population was 3,454.  The suburb comprises the majority of the North Ward of the Town of Bassendean.

Major facilities include Jubilee Reserve, Mary Crescent Reserve, Ashley Shave Skatepark, the Alf Faulkner community centre and the local education department Eden Hill Primary School.

References

Suburbs of Perth, Western Australia
Town of Bassendean